Cinelli–OPD was a UCI Continental team based in San Marino that existed for the 2007 and 2008 seasons.

The team's main sponsor was Cinelli, an Italian bicycle manufacturer.

Major wins
2007
 Tour de Serbie
Points classification, Ivan Fanelli
Stage 1b & 7, Ivan Fanelli
Stage 6, Gianluca Cavalli
 Giro d'Abruzzo
Stages 2 & 4, Ivan Fanelli
Stage 3, Gianluca Coletta
 Stage 3 Paths of King Nikola, Alexey Shchebelin
 Stage 5 Vuelta a la Comunidad de Madrid, Jesús Pérez 
2008
 Overall Tour du Maroc, Alexey Shchebelin
Stages 1a, 4 & 7, Alexey Shchebelin
Stage 1b, Ivan Fanelli
Stage 6b, Jesús Pérez 
 Overall Circuito Montañés, Alexey Shchebelin
Stage 6, Alexey Shchebelin
 Clásico Ciclístico Banfoandes
Stage 5, Juan Pablo Dotti
Stage 8, Manuele Spadi
 Stage 10 Vuelta Ciclista a Venezuela, Jesús Pérez 
 Stage 3 Vuelta Mexico, Ivan Fanelli
 Stage 1 Istrian Spring Trophy, Ivan Fanelli

References

UCI Continental Teams (Europe)
Cycling teams based in San Marino
Cycling teams established in 2007
Cycling teams disestablished in 2008